Zayd ibn ʿAlī (695–740), also spelled Zaid, was the son of Ali ibn al-Husayn Zayn al-Abidin, and great-grandson of Ali ibn Abi Talib. He led an unsuccessful revolt against the Umayyad Caliphate, in which he died. The event gave rise to the Zaydiyya sect of Shia Islam, which holds him as the next Imam after his father Ali ibn al-Husayn Zayn al-Abidin. Zayd ibn Ali is also seen as a major religious figure by many Sunnis and was supported by the prominent Sunni jurist, Abu Hanifa, who issued a fatwa in support of Zayd against the Umayyads.

To Twelver and Isma'ili Shias however, his elder half-brother Muhammad al-Baqir is seen as the next Imam of the Shias. Nevertheless, he is considered an important revolutionary figure by Shias and a martyr (shaheed) by all schools of Islam, Sunnis and Shias.
The calling for revenge for his death, and for the brutal display of his body, contributed to the Abbasid Revolution.

Zayd was a learned religious scholar. Various works are ascribed to him, including Musnad al-Imam Zayd (published by E. Grifinni as Corpus Iuris di Zaid b. ʿAlī, also known as Majmuʿ al-Fiqh), possibly the earliest known work of Islamic law. However, the attribution is disputed; these likely represent early Kufan legal tradition.

Birth
Zayd was born in Medina in 695 CE. He was the son of Ali ibn al-Husayn Zayn al-Abidin. Ibn Qutaybah in his book "al-Ma'ārif", republished in 1934 in Egypt, writes (at page 73) that one of the wives of the 4th Shia Imam was from Sindh (present-day Pakistan) and that she was the mother of Zayd ibn Ali. A similar claim has also been made in the book "Zayd Shaheed" by Abd al-Razzaq al-Hasani, published in Najaf. Zayd's mother Jodha was known by Muslim chroniclers as Jayda al-Sindhi.

Contemporary opinions
Zayd was a revered member of the Bayt (Household) of Muhammad. Scholars, Saints, Sufis and Imams alike, all spoke of him in respectful terms. When the ascetic Umayyad Caliph Umar ibn Abd al-Aziz was the Governor of Madinah during the reign of Al-Walid and Suleiman, he was an associate of Zayd ibn Ali. Zayd continued to correspond and advise him when he became the Khalifah.

Zayd is believed the first narrator of Al-Sahifa al-Sajjadiyya of Imam Zainul-'Abidin. Several works of hadith, theology, and Qur'anic exegesis are attributed to him. The first work of Islamic jurisprudence Mujmu'-al-Fiqh is attributed to him. The only surviving hand-written manuscript of this work dating back to at least a thousand years is preserved in the pope's library, Bibliotheca Vaticana in Vatican City under "Vaticani arabi". Photocopies of this rare work are available in several libraries including the Library of the University of Birmingham in the United Kingdom. In 2007, Sayyid Nafis Shah Al-Husayni Sayed Nafees al-Hussaini obtained a copy of this work, and re-issued it from Lahore.

He was an excellent orator and spent much of his life learning and educating others. It is said that his half-brother, Imam al-Baqir, wanted to test him on the Quranic knowledge, asking him various questions for which he received answers beyond his expectation, causing to him to remark, "For our father and mother's life! You are one of a kind. God grace your mother who gave you birth, she gave birth to a replica of your forefathers!" Al-Baqir also said: "No one of us was born to resemble 'Ali ibn Abi Talib more than he did."

When describing Zayd, his nephew, Imam Ja'far al-Sadiq, said: "Among us he was the best read in the Holy Qur'an, and the most knowledgeable about religion, and the most caring towards family and relatives." Hence his title Ḥalīf Al-Qurʾān. Jafar Sadiq's love for his uncle Zayd was immense. Upon receiving and reading the letter of Zayd ibn Ali's death he broke down and cried uncontrollably, and proclaimed aloud:

Imam Ali ar-Ridha said:

In one hadith, the Sunni Imam Abu Hanifa once said about Imam Zayd, "I met with Zayd and I never saw in his generation a person more knowledgeable, as quick a thinker, or more eloquent than he was." However, in another hadith, Abu Hanifa said: "I have not seen anyone with more knowledge than Ja'far ibn Muhammad." Imam Abu Hanifa was reportedly a student of Imam Ja'far, like another great Imam of Sunni Fiqh, that is Malik ibn Anas.

The Sufi scholar, Mujtahid and mystic, Sufyan al-Thawri, respected Imam Zayd's knowledge and character, saying "Zayd took the place of Imam al-Husayn. He was the most versed human concerning Allah's holy book. I affirm: women have not given birth to the likes of Zayd ... "

Al-Shaykh Al-Mufid the writer of the famous Shi'ah book Kitab al Irshad described him as, " ... a devout worshipper, pious, a jurist, God-fearing and brave."

Prophecy of martyrdom
Imam al-Baqir narrated: 
The Holy Prophet put his sacred hand on Al-Husayn bin Ali's back and said: "O Husayn, it will not be long until a man will be born among your descendants. He will be called Zaid; he will be killed as a martyr. On the day of resurrection, he and his companions will enter heaven, setting their feet on the necks of the people."

Imam Husayn narrated that his grandfather Muhammad prophesied his death:

Death
In AH 122 (AD 740), Zayd led an uprising against the Umayyad rule of Hisham ibn Abd al-Malik in the city of Kufa. Yusuf ibn Umar al-Thaqafi, the Umayyad governor of Iraq, managed to bribe the inhabitants of Kufa which allowed him to break the insurgence, killing Zayd in the process.

Shrines

There are two shrines for Zayd, One is in Kafel, Iraq, the other is in Karak, Jordan. The shrine in Jordan is believed to be the final resting place of the head of Zayd ibn 'Ali ibn Al-Husayn.

Legacy
All schools of Islam, Sunnis and Shias, regard Zayd as a righteous martyr against what was regarded as the corrupt leadership of an unjust king proclaimed to be a caliph. It is even reported that Mujtahid Imam Abu Hanifa, founder of the largest school of Sunni jurisprudence, gave financial support to Zayd's revolt, and called on others to join Zayd's rebellion. Zayd's rebellion inspired other revolts by members of his clan, especially in the Hejaz, the most famous among these being the revolt of Imam Muhammad al-Nafs al-Zakiyya al-Mahdi against the Abbasids in 762. 

Zaydis believe that he was a rightful Caliph, and their sect is named after him. It is believed that from them originated the word for Shi'ites, Rafida.

Descendants
Hasan, 1st son
Yahya, 2nd son
Husayn Dhu al-Dam'a, 3rd son
Isa Mawtam al-Ashbal, 4th son
Muhammad, 5th son
Yahya ibn Umar – lead an abortive uprising from Kufa in 250 A.H. (864-65 C.E.)

See also
Revolt of Zayd ibn Ali
Husayn ibn Ali
Hashemites
Zaidi (surname)
Dukayniyya Shia
Khalafiyya Shia
Ahmad ibn Isa ibn Zayd

References

External links
 Biodata at MuslimScholars.info

740 deaths
Zaydi imams
695 births
Muslim martyrs
People from Medina
8th-century Arabs
Husaynids
Assassinated royalty
Middle Eastern people of Indian descent